Syntozyga endaphana  is a tortrix moth (family Tortricidae), belonging to tribe Eucosmini of subfamily Olethreutinae. It is found in the Philippines, and looks very similar to Bubonoxena ephippias (Meyrick, 1907) but has narrower forewings and distinct genitalia.

References

Bactrini
Moths described in 1968